Lao national amateur boxing athletes represents Lao Democratic People's Republic in regional, continental and world matches and tournaments sanctioned by the International Boxing Association (AIBA).

Southeast Asian Games

2005 Manila Southeast Asian Games

Seven male and two female amateur boxers competed in the 2005 Southeast Asian Games in Manila. Marivone Phimsompttu won bronze medal in the women's bantamweight division. Two males from the Pinweight and Bantamweight divisions settled for bronze medals.

Entry list
Male
 Sikham Vongphakhoune (Pinweight) - Bronze
 Sayyaphone Chanthasone Light Flyweight
 Nhothin Holapatiphone Flyweight 
 Xayyalak Chanthasone Bantamweight - Bronze 
 Sathit Keo Inta Featherweight 
 Udone Khanxay Lightweight 
 Nilondon Tanovanh Light Welterweight
Female
 Chinda Maniphanh (Flyweight)
 Marivone Phimsomphou (Bantamweight) - Bronze

Asian Games

2006 Doha Asian Games

Three amateur boxers represented Lao DPR in this edition of the Asiad. None of the three boxers qualified for the quarterfinal rounds. Lao DPR is ranked 15th overall in boxing.

Entry list
 Nhothin Holapatiphone (Flyweight)
 Sathit Keo Inhta (Featherweight)
 Udone Khanxay (Lightweight)

References

Amateur boxing
Boxing in Laos